George Henry Barnard,  (November 9, 1868 – January 13, 1954) was a Canadian lawyer and Conservative politician.

Born in Victoria, British Columbia, the son of Francis Jones Barnard and Ellen Stillman, Barnard was educated
at Trinity College School in Port Hope, Ontario and qualified for the bar, entering practice in Victoria. He was appointed King's Counsel in 1907.

In 1902 he was elected to the Victoria City Council as an alderman, and from 1904 to 1905 was mayor. He represented Victoria City in the House of Commons of Canada for two terms from 1908 to 1917. He was then appointed to the Senate, where he served until retiring in 1945.

His brother Sir Frank Stillman Barnard was also an MP, who would become Lieutenant-Governor of British Columbia.

References
 
 

1868 births
1954 deaths
Lawyers in British Columbia
Canadian senators from British Columbia
Conservative Party of Canada (1867–1942) MPs
Conservative Party of Canada (1867–1942) senators
Mayors of Victoria, British Columbia
Members of the House of Commons of Canada from British Columbia
Canadian King's Counsel